Erskine Anton Norris (born 7 January 1940) is a former Barbadian high jumper.

Athletic career
Norris was born in Kirtons, Saint Philip, and first represented Barbados at the 1962 Central American and Caribbean Games in Kingston, Jamaica where he won silver in high jump with a jump of 1.98 metres. In doing so, he became the first athlete to win a bronze medal for Barbados and the first athlete to win a medal of any colour in a sport besides weightlifting for Barbados at the Commonwealth Games. The following year, Norris was part of the inaugural contingent to represent Barbados at the 1963 Pan American Games in São Paulo, Brazil. There he won one of the first medals for his country, bronze in high jump. In 1966, he repeated his performance of four year prior in taking the silver medal at the San Juan Central American and Caribbean Games in the high jump and the bronze in high jump at the Kingston British Empire and Commonwealth Games.

Norris was also a cricketer who played in one first-class cricket match for Barbados in February 1963 against British Guiana. Norris, selected in the team is a right-arm fast bolwer, took no wickets in the match which British Guiana won by 34 runs.

Business career
Norris holds a MBA degree in Management and International Business from New York University Graduate School of Business Administration, and a Bachelor of Arts degree with honours in Economics and Business Administration from the Interamerican University of Puerto Rico.

Norris has worked in business development for most of his career, while a senior executive of the Barbados Investment and Development Corporation, where he served as a Divisional Director and acting CEO. He was also Director of the Corporation's North American Operations, based in New York. He has assisted the promotion, start-up and development of a large number of local and international businesses and successfully implemented several technical assistance initiatives.

As a consultant, Anton also served as Regional Technical Advisor to the Investment Promotion and Export Development (IPED) Project, in the Economic Affairs Secretariat of the Organisation of Eastern Caribbean States, under the aegis of the United States Agency for International Development (USAID). As of March 2009, Norris was an associate consultant of May Hinds Consulting.

References

1940 births
Living people
People from Saint Philip, Barbados
Male high jumpers
Barbadian high jumpers
Barbadian cricketers
Barbados cricketers
Barbadian businesspeople
Commonwealth Games medallists in athletics
Commonwealth Games bronze medallists for Barbados
Pan American Games bronze medalists for Barbados
Pan American Games medalists in athletics (track and field)
Athletes (track and field) at the 1962 British Empire and Commonwealth Games
Athletes (track and field) at the 1966 British Empire and Commonwealth Games
Athletes (track and field) at the 1963 Pan American Games
Athletes (track and field) at the 1967 Pan American Games
Barbadian male athletes
Central American and Caribbean Games silver medalists for Barbados
Competitors at the 1962 Central American and Caribbean Games
Competitors at the 1966 Central American and Caribbean Games
Central American and Caribbean Games medalists in athletics
Medalists at the 1963 Pan American Games
Medallists at the 1962 British Empire and Commonwealth Games
Medallists at the 1966 British Empire and Commonwealth Games